Volodymyr Lanovyi (born 17 June 1952) is a Ukrainian statesman, politician, economical scientist.

Career
Lanovyi was born in Kyiv on June 17, 1952. A graduate of the Kyiv National Economic University, he began his working career at the institute of micro instruments in the Krystal Science Production Association in 1973. He worked there until 1990 with a brief stint of compulsory military service in the mid 1970s.

In 1990, Lanovyi headed a department in the Institute of Economy of the National Academy of Sciences of Ukraine and was a direct designer of the law "About the economic sovereignty of Ukraine". In 1991-92, Lanovyi was a state minister on issues of property and entrepreneurship. In 1992, he was a vice prime minister and minister of economy.

Volodymyr Lanoviy was an independent candidate of the 1994 Ukrainian presidential election. In the first round he was in 4th place,  supported by 2,483,986 votes (9.6%).

Founded the Club of Political Experts with the participation of the F. Ebert Foundation (Germany) for discussions of well-known politicians, businessmen and financiers in 1999.

In the July 2019 Ukrainian parliamentary election Lanovyi was fifth on the party list of Movement of New Forces.

References

External links
 Interview of Lanovyi to Ukraine Young
 Profile at finance.ua
 Profile at the portal Justus

1952 births
Living people
Politicians from Kyiv
Kyiv National Economic University alumni
Second convocation members of the Verkhovna Rada
Fifth convocation members of the Verkhovna Rada
Sixth convocation members of the Verkhovna Rada
Economy ministers of Ukraine
Vice Prime Ministers of Ukraine
Directors of the State Property Fund of Ukraine
Liberal Party of Ukraine politicians
People's Movement of Ukraine politicians
Our Ukraine (political party) politicians
Movement of New Forces politicians
State ministers of Ukraine
Candidates in the 1994 Ukrainian presidential election